

Paul-Louis Mercanton (11 May 1876 – 25 February 1963) was a Swiss glaciologist, meteorologist and Arctic explorer.

Mercanton was a member of expeditions to Spitsbergen (1910), Greenland (1912–1913) and Jan Mayen (1921 and 1929). Mercantonfjellet, a mountainous area on Svalbard, is named after him.

See also 
 Xavier Guillaume Mertz, contemporary Swiss polar explorer

Footnotes

Bibliography

External links 
 

1876 births
1963 deaths
Explorers of the Arctic
Swiss explorers
Swiss glaciologists
Swiss meteorologists
University of Lausanne alumni